Roy Swetman (born 25 October 1933, in Westminster, London) is an English former cricketer, who played in eleven Tests as a wicket-keeper from 1959 to 1960.

Life and career
Commencing his career with Surrey, for whom he was understudy to Arthur McIntyre, Swetman soon came to notice as a deft performer, even though his appearances were limited. He went to Pakistan with the MCC 'A' team in 1955–56, though at the time he was playing mostly for Surrey's second eleven. He replaced McIntyre as Surrey's keeper in 1956.

A useful batsman, Swetman failed to consolidate his place in the England team when given first bite at replacing the long-serving Test wicket-keeper Godfrey Evans. He toured Australia and New Zealand with the Test team in 1958–59, playing his first Tests when Evans was injured. He played against India in 1959, then toured the West Indies as the primary wicket-keeper in 1959–60. He lost his place at the end of the 1959-60 tour to Jim Parks, and later also fell behind John Murray in the Test selectors' eyes.

Surprisingly retiring from county cricket after the 1961 season, he returned in 1966 to play for Nottinghamshire. Again leaving rather abruptly, this time in 1967, he emerged as a replacement for Barry Meyer at Gloucestershire in 1972, but left when replaced by Andy Stovold in 1974.

Since leaving first-class cricket Swetman has been a publican, an antiques expert and an artist specializing in portraits of cricketers.

References

External links
 
 

1933 births
Living people
England Test cricketers
English cricketers
Surrey cricketers
Nottinghamshire cricketers
Gloucestershire cricketers
Combined Services cricketers
Commonwealth XI cricketers
International Cavaliers cricketers
People from Westminster
Marylebone Cricket Club cricketers
Players cricketers
D. H. Robins' XI cricketers
T. N. Pearce's XI cricketers
Wicket-keepers